Is trúag in ces i mbiam ... is the first line and title of a poem which survives on two sixteenth-century vellum manuscripts, and one on paper from the second decade of the seventeenth. The poem probably dates from the earlier half of the Middle Irish period. It is in the metre called rannaigecht recomarcach, or rannaigecht bec.

The poem (extracts)

References

 Two Religious Poems in Irish, Brian Ó Cuív, Celtica 20, pp. 73–84, 1988.

Irish poems
Early Irish literature
Irish literature
Irish-language literature
Medieval poetry